Potworów may refer to the following places in Poland:
Potworów, Lower Silesian Voivodeship (south-west Poland)
Potworów, Masovian Voivodeship (east-central Poland)
Potworów PGR, also within Przysucha County, Masovian Voivodeship, in east-central Poland
Potworów, Greater Poland Voivodeship (west-central Poland)